The 2004–05 Detroit Red Wings season would have been their 79th National Hockey League season; however, it was cancelled as the 2004–05 NHL lockout could not be resolved in time to save the season.

Offseason

Schedule
The Red Wings regular season schedule was announced on July 14, 2004.

|-
| 1 || September 26 || Boston Bruins
|-
| 2 || September 28 || @ Colorado Avalanche
|-
| 3 || September 30 || @ Boston Bruins
|-
| 4 || October 1 || @ Toronto Maple Leafs
|-
| 5 || October 2 || @ Dallas Stars
|-
| 6 || October 5 || Colorado Avalanche
|-
| 7 || October 7 || @ Dallas Stars
|-
| 8 || October 9 || Toronto Maple Leafs
|-
| 9 || October 10 || @ New York Rangers
|-

|-
| 1 || October 14 || @ Edmonton Oilers
|-
| 2 || October 16 || @ Vancouver Canucks
|-
| 3 || October 20 || Carolina Hurricanes
|-
| 4 || October 22 || Chicago Blackhawks
|-
| 5 || October 23 || @ New Jersey Devils
|-
| 6 || October 25 || Anaheim Mighty Ducks
|-
| 7 || October 27 || Dallas Stars
|-
| 8 || October 29 || @ Atlanta Thrashers
|-
| 9 || October 30 || @ Nashville Predators
|-
| 10 || November 2 || Edmonton Oilers
|-
| 11 || November 5 || @ Columbus Blue Jackets
|-
| 12 || November 6 || Phoenix Coyotes
|-
| 13 || November 9 || Los Angeles Kings
|-
| 14 || November 11 || @ Washington Capitals
|-
| 15 || November 13 || Columbus Blue Jackets
|-
| 16 || November 17 || @ San Jose Sharks
|-
| 17 || November 19 || @ Anaheim Mighty Ducks
|-
| 18 || November 20 || @ Los Angeles Kings
|-
| 19 || November 24 || Calgary Flames
|-
| 20 || November 26 || Minnesota Wild
|-
| 21 || November 27 || @ St. Louis Blues
|-
| 22 || November 29 || San Jose Sharks
|-
| 23 || December 1 || Columbus Blue Jackets
|-
| 24 || December 3 || Chicago Blackhawks
|-
| 25 || December 4 || @ Pittsburgh Penguins
|-
| 26 || December 6 || St. Louis Blues
|-
| 27 || December 8 || @ Colorado Avalanche
|-
| 28 || December 10 || @ Vancouver Canucks
|-
| 29 || December 11 || @ Calgary Flames
|-
| 30 || December 14 || Chicago Blackhawks
|-
| 31 || December 16 || Vancouver Canucks
|-
| 32 || December 17 || @ Chicago Blackhawks
|-
| 33 || December 19 || Ottawa Senators
|-
| 34 || December 21 || New York Islanders
|-
| 35 || December 26 || @ St. Louis Blues
|-
| 36 || December 27 || @ Dallas Stars
|-
| 37 || December 29 || @ Phoenix Coyotes
|-
| 38 || December 31 || Vancouver Canucks
|-
| 39 || January 2 || @ New York Islanders
|-
| 40 || January 5 || Nashville Predators
|-
| 41 || January 8 || @ Colorado Avalanche
|-
| 42 || January 9 || @ Chicago Blackhawks
|-
| 43 || January 11 || @ Boston Bruins
|-
| 44 || January 13 || Nashville Predators
|-
| 45 || January 15 || Toronto Maple Leafs
|-
| 46 || January 17 || Dallas Stars
|-
| 47 || January 19 || Calgary Flames
|-
| 48 || January 21 || @ Dallas Stars
|-
| 49 || January 22 || @ Phoenix Coyotes
|-
| 50 || January 26 || @ Chicago Blackhawks
|-
| 51 || January 29 || Colorado Avalanche
|-
| 52 || February 1 || Anaheim Mighty Ducks
|-
| 53 || February 3 || @ Edmonton Oilers
|-
| 54 || February 5 || @ Calgary Flames
|-
| 55 || February 9 || Los Angeles Kings
|-
| 56 || February 15 || Buffalo Sabres
|-
| 57 || February 17 || St. Louis Blues
|-
| 58 || February 19 || @ Tampa Bay Lightning
|-
| 59 || February 20 || @ Florida Panthers
|-
| 60 || February 23 || New Jersey Devils
|-
| 61 || February 26 || San Jose Sharks
|-
| 62 || February 27 || @ Nashville Predators
|-
| 63 || March 1 || Edmonton Oilers
|-
| 64 || March 3 || Montreal Canadiens
|-
| 65 || March 5 || Pittsburgh Penguins
|-
| 66 || March 8 || Phoenix Coyotes
|-
| 67 || March 10 || @ Minnesota Wild
|-
| 68 || March 11 || @ Columbus Blue Jackets
|-
| 69 || March 13 || Colorado Avalanche
|-
| 70 || March 16 || Nashville Predators
|-
| 71 || March 19 || @ San Jose Sharks
|-
| 72 || March 21 || @ Anaheim Mighty Ducks
|-
| 73 || March 22 || @ Los Angeles Kings
|-
| 74 || March 24 || St. Louis Blues
|-
| 75 || March 26 || New York Rangers
|-
| 76 || March 28 || @ St. Louis Blues
|-
| 77 || March 31 || @ Nashville Predators
|-
| 78 || April 1 || Columbus Blue Jackets
|-
| 79 || April 3 || @ Philadelphia Flyers
|-
| 80 || April 6 || @ Columbus Blue Jackets
|-
| 81 || April 8 || Minnesota Wild
|-
| 82 || April 10 || @ Minnesota Wild
|-

Transactions
The Red Wings were involved in the following transactions from June 8, 2004, the day after the deciding game of the 2004 Stanley Cup Finals, through February 16, 2005, the day the  season was officially cancelled.

Trades
The Red Wings did not make any trades.

Players acquired

Players lost

Signings

Draft picks
Detroit's picks at the 2004 NHL Entry Draft, which was held at the RBC Center in Raleigh, North Carolina on June 26–27, 2004.

Notes

References

Detroit Red Wings seasons
Detroit
Detroit
Detroit Red Wings
Detroit Red Wings